Gayraud is a surname. Notable people with the name include:

Mario Gayraud (born 1957), Argentine racing driver
Pierre Gayraud (born 1992), French rugby union player
William Gayraud-Hirigoyen (1898–1962), French rugby union player

See also
Gayraud Wilmore (born 1921), American writer, historian, ethicist, educator, and theologian